Ajudua is a Nigerian surname. Notable people with the surname include:

Benedicta Ajudua (born 1980), Nigerian sprinter
Fred Ajudua, Nigerian criminal

Surnames of Nigerian origin